Pèrèrè  is a town, arrondissement, and commune in the Borgou Department of eastern Benin. The commune covers an area of 2017 square kilometres (1253 square miles) and as of 2013 had a population of 78,988 people.

References

Communes of Benin
Populated places in Benin